Thomas Boutillier (October 9, 1797 – December 8, 1861) was a Quebec doctor and political figure.

He was born in Quebec City in 1797 and studied at the Séminaire de Saint-Hyacinthe and the University of Philadelphia. He was licensed to practice medicine in 1817 and settled at Saint-Hyacinthe. In 1826, he married Eugénie, the daughter of André Papineau, a member of the Lower Canada assembly, and a cousin of Louis-Joseph Papineau; she died in 1830. In 1834, he was elected to the Legislative Assembly of Lower Canada for Saint-Hyacinthe county. He took part in the battle of Saint-Charles during the Lower Canada Rebellion, later fleeing to the United States. In 1838, he returned to Saint-Hyacinthe. He was elected to the Legislative Assembly of the Province of Canada for Saint 
Hyacinthe in 1841; he was reelected in 1844 and 1848. Boutillier opposed annexation with the United States. In 1854, he was named inspector of land offices.

He died at Saint-Hyacinthe in 1861.

External links
 

1797 births
1861 deaths
Members of the Legislative Assembly of Lower Canada
Members of the Legislative Assembly of the Province of Canada from Canada East
People from Saint-Hyacinthe
Politicians from Quebec City